Avies AS was an airline and is now a travel company based in Tallinn, Estonia. Its main base was Lennart Meri Tallinn Airport. Avies operated flights from Tallinn to Kärdla and Kuressaare in Estonia.

History
Avies was established and started operations in 1991 and operated scheduled passenger transport, charter and air taxi services.

All domestic flights in Sweden were cancelled in March 2015, due to contract cancellation by Swedish Traffic Administration. Before that Avies flew three domestic routes in Sweden. Avies was declared bankrupt by court on 26 June 2015, however continued to operate as usual. 

However, the remaining flights from Lennart Meri Tallinn Airport to Kuressaare Airport, Kärdla Airport and Stockholm-Arlanda were suspended on 1 April 2016, after the airline's operating license was withdrawn by Estonian Civil Aviation Administration for a duration of six months over safety concerns.

Destinations 
Until its license has been revoked in April 2016, Avies served the following scheduled destinations:

Tallinn – Lennart Meri Tallinn Airport base
Kärdla – Kärdla Airport
Kuressaare – Kuressaare Airport

Stockholm – Stockholm Arlanda Airport

Fleet 

As of December 2014, the Avies fleet included the following aircraft.

 1 Bombardier Learjet 31A
 1 Bombardier Learjet 55C
 2 Bombardier Learjet 60
 4 BAe Jetstream 31
 1 BAe Jetstream 32
 1 Hawker Beechcraft 750
 1 Let L-410 Turbolet

Accidents and incidents
On 13 February 2013, a Jetstream belonging to Avies landed at Pajala with two wheels outside the paved runway. No damage to the aircraft.
On 3 May 2013, a Jetstream belonging to Avies got trouble with both engines after departure from Sveg. They had too low RPM, but there was no warning from the plane system for that. The pilots returned to Sveg and managed to get better power from the engines before landing.
On 31 January 2014, a Jetstream belonging to Avies skidded off the snow-covered runway at Torsby Airport.

See also

References

External links
 Official website (archived version)

Defunct airlines of Estonia
Airlines established in 1991
Airlines disestablished in 2016
1991 establishments in Estonia
2016 disestablishments in Estonia
Companies based in Tallinn